Marie March is an American restaurateur and politician who is the delegate for the 7th district of the Virginia House of Delegates. March, a Republican, defeated Democratic nominee businessman Derek Kitts in the 2021 Virginia House of Delegates election.

March attended Donald Trump's rally on January 6, 2021 prior to the attack on the US Capitol. She claims to have left before the riot began.

References

Living people
Year of birth missing (living people)
Republican Party members of the Virginia House of Delegates
Protesters in or near the January 6 United States Capitol attack
Women state legislators in Virginia
21st-century American women politicians
21st-century American politicians